Ercüment Kalmık (1909 in Istanbul – February 21, 1971 in Istanbul) was an artist and art historian, known for his work in studying the lyrical-abstract Turkish painters .

After completing high school at the Galata Scottish Mission, Kalmik studied in the Department of Painting at the Academy of Fine Arts from 1929 and worked in the ateliers of  Nazmi Ziya and Ibrahim Calli. While still a student he also worked at the Cumhuriyet newspaper. Between 1933 and 1935 he completed his military service. He graduated from the Academy in 1937 and in 1939 went to Paris to study painting in André Lhote's studio while also taking some courses in art history at the Sorbonne University. After returning to Turkey in 1940 he taught at various high schools in Ankara and Istanbul (1942–47). He returned to the army in 1941 and completed his service in 1942. 

In 1947 he began to teach composition in the Istanbul Technical University Faculty of Architecture. In 1954 he visited Italy. In 1962 he took part in the Sao Paulo Bienale. Then between 1967 and 68 he was a guest lecturer in basic design at Berlin Technical University.

Originally influenced by Impressionism, Kalmık later became interested in European Cubism and was influenced by Braque, Picasso, Fernand Léger and Henri Matisse. After returning to Turkey he maintained an interest in figurative abstraction and developed a strong sense of pattern. During the 1960s many of his works featured fishermen and boats in front of abstract landscapes. Kalmik is known for his etchings  as well as his prints. He also produced some public mosaics, including the fine one on a wall in 4.Levent, Istanbul. 

Kalmik participated in many group and solo exhibitions both domestically and abroad. Some of his works are on display in the Istanbul Painting and Sculpture Museum as well as in the Ankara Paintinga nd Sculpture Museum and in private collections.  

Istanbul Technical University published his two books, "Systems of Colour Harmony" and "Textures in Nature and Art" in the 1950s. 

In 1997 his wife, Ayşe Kalmik, converted their Art Nouveau-style wooden house in Gümüşsuyu in Istanbul into a museum now run by the Ercüment Kalmık Foundation.

References 

1909 births
1971 deaths
20th-century Turkish painters